Drew Gulak (born April 28, 1987) is an American professional wrestler and professional wrestling trainer. He is currently signed to WWE, where he performs on the NXT brand. He is a former one-time WWE Cruiserweight Champion and an eight-time WWE 24/7 Champion.

Gulak was previously best known for his work in Combat Zone Wrestling (CZW), where he was a one-time CZW World Heavyweight Champion, two-time CZW World Tag Team Champion, one-time CZW Wired TV Champion, and the 2005 Chris Cash Memorial Battle Royal winner. He also worked for other independent promotions including Chikara, Evolve, and Pro Wrestling Guerrilla.

Professional wrestling career

Combat Zone Wrestling (2005–2016)
Gulak began training for a career in professional wrestling in 2004 at the Combat Zone Wrestling (CZW) Wrestling Academy and the Chikara Wrestle Factory. He made his debut for CZW on September 10, 2005, at Down With The Sickness 4-Ever, a tribute show to Chris Cash, winning a battle royal. Gulak was quickly paired up with fellow CZW Wrestling Academy alumnus Andy Sumner and, known as Team AnDrew, the duo captured the CZW World Tag Team Championship twice before disbanding in 2009.

Gulak moved into singles competition following the dissolution of the team, and in early 2010, he won the CZW Wired TV Championship by defeating Tyler Veritas at a television taping at Swinging for the Fences. Gulak held the title for 429 days, defeating wrestlers including Nick Gage, Zack Sabre Jr., Rich Swann, and Sumner. During his reign as the Wired TV Champion, Gulak began to characterize himself as a political leader and activist within CZW, speaking out against ethical issues of violence, including CZW's famed ultraviolence and the frequent manhandling of company referees, specifically targeting the actions of long-time fan favorite Nick Gage. Gage was legitimately arrested in late 2010 for bank robbery, and Gulak worked it into storylines by mocking Gage and associating himself with Gage's former manager Dewey Donovan. He also continued to speak out against violence and mismanagement within CZW. This drew the ire of several roster members such as former training partner Danny Havoc, Jon Moxley, and Devon Moore, who began interrupting Gulak's presentations and attacking him. In response, Gulak hired Nui Tofiga for protection. On June 11, 2011, Gulak lost the Wired TV Championship to A. R. Fox at Prelude to Violence 2. Gulak then began expanding his "Campaign for a better Combat Zone" by recruiting Alexander James as his intern and Kimber Lee as an activist for women's rights in professional wrestling.

At Tangled Web 6 on August 10, 2013, Gulak defeated Masada to win the CZW World Heavyweight Championship. At Proving Grounds in May 2014, Gulak lost the title to Biff Busick.

Independent circuit (2005–2017) 

Aside from CZW, Gulak has also worked for Beyond Wrestling, Dragon Gate USA, Evolve, and Inter Species Wrestling. In 2013, he won the Style Battle tournament for Evolve and later participated in the 2014 edition. In August 2014, Gulak made his debut for Pro Wrestling Guerrilla, participating in their annual Battle of Los Angeles event. Gulak has participated in Chikara's annual King of Trios tournament multiple times; in 2008, he teamed with Andy Sumner and Tim Donst, in 2014, he competed alongside Chuck Taylor and the Swamp Monster, and in 2016, he was part of Team #CWC, alongside Cedric Alexander and Johnny Gargano. When competing as Drew Gulak, his team failed to progress from the first round every time. However, as Soldier Ant, his team, The Colony, won the 2011 edition of the tournament.

Gulak has also competed internationally. In June 2016, Gulak traveled to the Channel Islands to make his debut for Channel Island World Wrestling.

WWE

No-Fly Zone (2016–2018)
On May 7, 2016, Gulak defeated Tracy Williams at Evolve 61 to qualify for WWE's upcoming Cruiserweight Classic tournament. The tournament began on June 23, with Gulak defeating Harv Sihra in his first round match. On July 14, Gulak was eliminated from the tournament by Zack Sabre Jr. Gulak appeared on September 14 episode of NXT, losing to Hideo Itami. On September 26 episode of Raw, Gulak made his main roster debut, teaming with Lince Dorado in a losing effort to Cedric Alexander and Rich Swann. On the Hell in a Cell pre-show, Gulak established himself as a heel, teaming up with Tony Nese and Ariya Daivari in a losing effort to Cedric Alexander, Lince Dorado, and Sin Cara. On the Survivor Series pre-show, Gulak, Tony Nese, and Ariya Daivari lost to T.J. Perkins, Rich Swann, and Noam Dar. In December, it was confirmed that Gulak had signed with WWE. On January 2, 2017, episode of Raw, Gulak won his first match on the main roster against Cedric Alexander.

In 2017, Gulak introduced a new gimmick in WWE, beginning to campaign for a "Better 205 Live", in a nod to his previous character in CZW. The campaign included Gulak asking Mustafa Ali to use a more conservative in-ring style as part of a "No-Fly Zone" campaign. This prompted a feud between the two, which ended on July 18 episode of 205 Live, when Gulak lost to Ali in a two out of three falls match. As part of his gimmick, he began incorporating his own PowerPoint Presentations every week on his plans for a better 205 Live. Gulak went on to feud with Akira Tozawa about his war cry chanting. On October 10 episode of 205 Live, Gulak attacked Tozawa on the ramp and later injured his voice box. Tozawa gained revenge on Gulak, which led to a match on October 31 episode of 205 Live, which Tozawa won. Gulak had aligned with Enzo Amore and became a member of Amore's faction "The Zo Train", while continuing his rivalry with Tozawa. On November 21 episode of 205 Live, Gulak lost to Tozawa in a Street Fight, ending their feud. On December 4 episode of Raw, Gulak won a fatal four-way match to face Rich Swann the following week, with the winner earning a match against Enzo Amore for the WWE Cruiserweight Championship. However, Swann was suspended prior to the match and replaced with Cedric Alexander. On December 18 episode of Raw, Gulak lost to Cedric Alexander, making him unable to face Amore for the WWE Cruiserweight Championship. On January 23, 2018, Amore was fired from WWE and "Zo Train" was quietly disbanded.

Cruiserweight Champion (2018–2019)
In February 2018, Gulak was entered into a 16-man single elimination tournament to determine a new WWE Cruiserweight Champion, with the final round set to occur at WrestleMania 34. Gulak defeated both Tony Nese and Mark Andrews via submission en route to the semi-finals, where he lost to Mustafa Ali. During this time, Gulak stopped the PowerPoint Presentations and his "No-Fly Zone" campaign for a better 205 Live, and developed a new character with aspirations to be the best submission specialist in WWE. Around this time, Gulak formed an alliance with Gentleman Jack Gallagher and The Brian Kendrick to feud with Lucha House Party (Kalisto, Gran Metalik, and Lince Dorado), with the two teams trading victories, including a six-man tag team elimination match, which Gulak won for his team. On July 24 episode of 205 Live, Gulak won a fatal four-way match also involving Mustafa Ali, Hideo Itami and TJP to become the number one contender to the WWE Cruiserweight Championship. Gulak challenged Cedric Alexander for the Cruiserweight Championship at SummerSlam and on September 19 episode of 205 Live, where he was unsuccessful both times.

On October 3 episode of 205 Live, Gulak and Gallagher attacked Kendrick, citing him as the "weak link" of the team. This led to Kendrick allying himself with former rival Akira Tozawa to face Gulak and Gallagher, with the two sides trading victories, culminating in a Street Fight on December 18 episode of 205 Live, where Gulak and Gallagher lost. Afterwards, Gulak and Gallagher would try to recruit Humberto Carrillo into their stable, while also trying to convince him to stop using high-flying moves and adopt more ground based offense. Gulak competed in a tournament to determine a new challenger for Buddy Murphy's Cruiserweight Championship at WrestleMania 35, where he defeated The Brian Kendrick in the first round, but lost to eventual winner Tony Nese in the semifinals. On April 9, 2019, episode of 205 Live, after Gulak attacked Humberto Carrillo during his match with Gallagher, Gallagher headbutted Gulak out of the ring, thus ending their alliance.

Following April, Gulak was taken off television and posted a series of cryptic tweets hinting at a dark turn for his character. He returned to the ring in June, displaying a more aggressive attitude and in-ring repertoire. During this time, Gulak continued to remove elements of his previous gimmick, such as doing campaign slogans and PowerPoint presentations. In his first match back, Gulak sported all black ring gear and slicked back hair, as he attacked Noam Dar before defeating Akira Tozawa. The following week, he participated in a fatal four-way match against Tozawa, Humberto Carrillo, and Oney Lorcan to determine the number one contender for the WWE Cruiserweight Championship, where he and Tozawa pinned each other's shoulders on the mat. Therefore, they both won the match and earned the right to challenge Nese at Stomping Grounds in a triple match, where Gulak pinned Tozawa to win the Cruiserweight Championship for the first time.

Gulak then defeated Nese at Extreme Rules in a rematch for the title. At SummerSlam, Gulak successfully defended his title against Oney Lorcan after using underhanded tactics. Two days later on 205 Live, Gulak again retained his title against Lorcan by submission. At Clash of the Champions, Gulak retained the Cruiserweight Championship in a triple threat match against Lince Dorado and Humberto Carrillo. Gulak lost the renamed NXT Cruiserweight Championship to Lio Rush on October 9 episode of NXT, ending his reign at 108 days. On October 11 episode of 205 Live, Gulak teamed with Tony Nese against Oney Lorcan and Danny Burch in a losing effort in what would turn out to be Gulak's final match on 205 Live.

Alliance with Daniel Bryan (2019–2020)
As part of the 2019 draft, Gulak was drafted to the SmackDown brand. Gulak, once again doing his campaigning gimmick, made his debut on October 18 episode of SmackDown where he attempted to show Braun Strowman a PowerPoint Presentation on how to beat Tyson Fury, but was quickly defeated by Strowman. The following week, he would attempt to show a PowerPoint Presentation on how Braun Strowman can lose to Tyson Fury before his match with Kalisto, but he was once again attacked by Strowman. On November 15 episode of SmackDown, Gulak along with The B-Team (Curtis Axel and Bo Dallas) would taunt Strowman for his loss against Tyson Fury, but Strowman would attack all three men.

On February 21, 2020, episode of SmackDown, Gulak began a feud with Daniel Bryan after claiming to have "found holes in his game" and placed him in matches against opponents such as Heath Slater and Curtis Axel to test his weaknesses but Bryan came out victorious. On March 6 episode of SmackDown, Bryan challenged Gulak to a match at Elimination Chamber, which Gulak lost.

On March 13 episode of SmackDown, Gulak formed an alliance with Daniel Bryan after both men gained mutual respect for each other, turning face in the process. He subsequently managed Bryan during his match against Cesaro, where both were subsequently attacked by Cesaro, Shinsuke Nakamura, and Sami Zayn. The following week, Gulak and Bryan teamed up to defeat Cesaro and Nakamura in a tag-team match. On March 27 episode of SmackDown, Gulak defeated Nakamura to earn Bryan an Intercontinental Championship match against Zayn at WrestleMania 36. During the first night of WrestleMania on April 4, Gulak was defeated by Cesaro on the pre-show while Bryan was unsuccessful in winning the Intercontinental Championship from Zayn on the main card. On May 15 episode of SmackDown, Gulak competed in a tournament for the vacant Intercontinental Championship, but was eliminated by Bryan in the first round. After this match, the following day, Gulak's contract with WWE expired.

24/7 Champion (2020–2021)
On May 25, 2020, it was reported that Gulak was re-signed by WWE, and his profile on WWE.com was moved back to the SmackDown roster page. On May 29 episode of SmackDown, Gulak participated in his first match back for WWE, a 10-man battle royal for a spot in the WWE Intercontinental Championship tournament but was eliminated by King Corbin. On June 5 episode of SmackDown, Gulak defeated AJ Styles with a bridging folding press. This earned him an Intercontinental Championship match against Styles on July 3 episode of SmackDown where he was unsuccessful in capturing the title. On July 17, Gulak served as a guest commentator on 205 Live alongside Vic Joseph where he continued to provide commentary for the show until the return of Nigel McGuinness. At Clash of Champions, Gulak pinned R-Truth to become the WWE 24/7 Champion for the first time. He would lose the title back to Truth later on in the night.

As part of the 2020 Draft in October, Gulak was drafted to the Raw brand. Over the following months, he kept on chasing after the 24/7 Championship, mainly feuding with R-Truth and Akira Tozawa and capturing it on several occasions also turning into a tweener in the process. During the Survivor Series kickoff show, Gulak won the title for the seventh time as The Gobbledy Gooker, a comedic character original portrayed by Héctor Guerrero at the 1990 Survivor Series event; this reign is recognized by WWE as a reign for The Gobbledy Gooker, but not for Gulak. On the January 11 episode of Raw, Gulak would face AJ Styles for a chance to qualify for the 2021 Royal Rumble but was unsuccessful. Following this, Gulak would wrestle mainly on Main Event. As part of the 2021 Draft, Gulak was drafted to the SmackDown brand.

Backstage interviewer and return to NXT (2022–present) 
On the April 15 episode of SmackDown, Gulak became a backstage interviewer for the brand. He would make an appearance on NXT in December.

On the February 14, 2023 episode of NXT, Gulak turned on Hank Walker and aligned with his opponent, Charlie Dempsey, turning heel for the first time since 2020.

Other media 
Gulak made his video game debut as a playable character in WWE 2K19, and subsequently in WWE 2K20 , WWE 2K22 and WWE 2K23.

Personal life
Gulak is Jewish. He is an alumnus of Northeast High School, having grown up in the city of Philadelphia. He also works at the WWE Performance Center as a trainer.

Gulak is close friends with fellow wrestlers Matt Riddle, Biff Busick, Timothy Thatcher, Orange Cassidy, Tracy Williams, and the late Danny Havoc, the latter of whom he paid tribute to during his Intercontinental Championship match against AJ Styles.

Championships and accomplishments
Beyond Wrestling
Tournament For Tomorrow 3:16 (2014) – with Biff Busick
Championship Wrestling from Hollywood
 CWFH Heritage Tag Team Championship (1 time) – with Timothy Thatcher
Chikara
Campeonatos de Parejas (1 time) – with Fire Ant
King of Trios (2011) – with Fire Ant and Green Ant
Tag World Grand Prix (2008) – with Fire Ant
Torneo Cibernetico (2014)
Combat Zone Wrestling
CZW World Heavyweight Championship (1 time)
CZW World Tag Team Championship (2 times) – with Andy Sumner
CZW Wired TV Championship (1 time)
Chris Cash Memorial Battle Royal (2005)
Fifth Triple Crown Champion
DDT Pro-Wrestling
Ironman Heavymetalweight Championship (1 time)
Eastern Wrestling Alliance
EWA Cruiserweight Championship (1 time)
EWA Tag Team Championships (1 time) - with Andy Sumner
Evolve
Evolve Tag Team Championship (1 time) – with Tracy Williams
Style Battle Tournament (2013)
New York Wrestling Connection
Master of the Mat (2014)
Pro Wrestling Illustrated
 Ranked No. 60 of the top 500 singles wrestlers in the PWI 500 in 2020
United Wrestling Network
UWN Tag Team Championship (1 time) – with Timothy Thatcher
 WWE
 WWE 24/7 Championship (8 times)
 WWE Cruiserweight Championship (1 time)
 Slammy Award (1 time)
 Most Creative 24/7 Pin of the Year (2020)

Luchas de Apuestas record

Notes

See also
 List of Jewish professional wrestlers

References

External links

 
 
 
 
 

1987 births
American male professional wrestlers
Jewish American sportspeople
Jewish professional wrestlers
Living people
Professional wrestlers from Pennsylvania
Sportspeople from Philadelphia
WWE 24/7 Champions
NXT/WWE Cruiserweight Champions
21st-century American Jews
21st-century professional wrestlers
CZW Wired Champions
Ironman Heavymetalweight Champions